Gaston Méliès (February 12, 1852 – April 9, 1915) was a French film director who worked primarily in the United States. He was the brother of the film director Georges Méliès.

Biography
Gaston and the third and elder Méliès brother, Henri, ran the family shoe factory in Paris. They landed a contract with the French War Ministry that looked to make them both wealthy. Unfortunately, the price of leather increased sharply, and they were unable to meet their costs. The factory shut down and the Méliès brothers lost their business.

Georges Méliès had produced films in France, which had become popular around the world. Some distributors began infringing Méliès work, especially in the United States. Georges Méliès asked his brother Gaston to go the United States and guard  Georges's copyrights.

Gaston Méliès arrived in New York City in 1902, formed the American branch of the Star Film Company, and began distributing his brother's films. By 1903, Gaston began making films himself, mostly documentaries. The films were not successful. In the summer of 1907, Gaston Méliès returned to France to take care of some business with Georges. On September 11, 1907, he married Hortense-Louise de Mirmont, an elder sister of Lucien Reulos' wife, who was one of Georges Méliès' first collaborators. The new couple left Paris a few days after their marriage and travelled from Le Havre to New York on the ship La Savoie, where they arrived September 28, 1907.

In need of warmer winters to allow for year-round film production, Méliès moved the Star Film Company to San Antonio, Texas, and leased twenty acres including a two-story house and large barn that became the "Star Film Ranch" movie studio. He acted in two of his movies playing a priest in The Immortal Alamo (1911) and The Kiss of Mary Jane (1911).

In April, 1911, Gaston moved the company to Santa Paula, California, following the trend of other movie studios to relocate in California.

In 1912 and 1913 Méliès travelled around Asia Pacific with his family and a film crew of close to 20 people, with whom he filmed in French Polynesia, New Zealand, Australia, Tahiti, Indonesia, Singapore, Cambodia and Japan in search of exotic subjects. During this trip which lasted from July 1912 to May 1913, Gaston Méliès filmed 64 movies, sending the footage back to his son Paul in New York, but this footage was often damaged or unusable. Gaston was no longer able to fulfill Star Film's obligation to Thomas Edison's company. Gaston lost $50,000 and had to cease production. He went to California, sold the American branch of Star Films to Vitagraph Studios, and then returned to Europe. He and his brother Georges (who blamed Gaston for his own financial difficulties) never spoke to one another again.

Méliès and his wife moved to Corsica in the winter of 1913. He died in Corsica on April 9, 1915 of "shellfish poisoning." He was buried on April 14, 1915 in Saint-Vincent Cemetery in Montmartre, Paris, in a tomb belonging to his second wife's family, De Mirmont.

Filmography
Unless otherwise referenced, the following information is adapted from the research of Paul Hammond. All films were released by the Star Film Company.

1903–1909
In the table below, "SFC" refers to the numbers used for film listings in the Star Film Company catalogues; Hammond's research identifies the catalogue numbers for the first three of Gaston Méliès's films. Film length is given in meters and feet.

1910–1912

The following films, all one-reelers, were made between 7 April 1910 and 25 July 1912 in Texas and California.

Cyclone Pete in Matrimony
Making Sherry Wine at Xeres
Branding the Thief
The Seal of the Church
The First Born
The Lover's Oracle
Trawlers Fishing in a Hurricane
The Story of Old Mexico
Volcanic Eruptions
The Rival Miners
The Debt Repaid
Indian Drama
Speed Versus Death
A Thrilling Race Against Time
A Race for a Bride
A Rough Night on the Bridge
The Palefaced Princess'The Padre's SecretLove's C. Q. D.A Texas JokeWhite Doe's LoversThe Stranded ActorThe Ruling PassionThe Little PreacherThe Golden SecretA Postal SubstituteThe Woman in the CaseMrs. Bargainday's BabyThe Return to To-Wa-WaThe Winning WayThe Romance of Circle RanchWon in the FifthIn the Mission ShadowsThe Salt on the Bird's TailA Plucky American GirlBill's SisterBaseball That's AllOut of MischiefUncle JimUnder the Stars and BarsBirthday CigarsGenerous CustomersA Mountain WifeHis Sergeant's StripesThe Cowboy and the Bachelor GirlPalsWhat Great Bear LearnedOld Norris' GalA Western WelcomeIn the Tall Grass CountryThe Crimson ScarsThe Owner of the "LL" RanchChanging CooksHow Mary Met the CowpunchersOnly a SisterTony the GreaserBilly and His PalMy Prairie FlowerIn the Hot LandsThe Snake in the GrassThe Schoolmarm of Coyote CountrySir Percy and the PunchersThe Warrant for Red RubeHer Faithful HeartJack Wilson's Last DealAn Unwilling CowboyThe Reformation of Jack RobinsMary's StratagemThe Spring Round-UpThe Redemption of RawhideThe Immortal AlamoIn Time for PressHer Spoiled BoyWhen the Tables TurnedThe Kiss of Mary JaneThe Honor of the FlagRight of WayThe Great Heart of the WestThe Strike at the GringoBessie's RideAt the Gringo MineRed Cloud's SecretHis Terrible LessonThe Local BullyTwo Foolies and their FolliesA Spanish Love SongThe Call of the WildernessA Shattered Dream$200.00The Mission WaifThe Hobo CowboyThe Stolen GreyTommy's Rocking HorseThe Cross of PearlsThe Gypsy BrideRight or WrongMexican As It Is SpokenThe Spur of NecessityThe Miser MinerAn Oil County RomanceThe Reason WhyA Western GirlThe Better ManThe Mission FatherThe Ranch Man's Debt of HonorA Woman's GratitudeRoped InAlice's ChoiceThe Outlaw and the BabyThe MortgageCowboy Vs TenderfootDodging the SheriffSmiling BobMelita's RuseThe SwastikaAll Is FairThe Rustler's DaughterOilThe Sheriff's DaughterTroubles of the XL OutfitThe Remittance ManA Man Worth WhileWanted—A WifeThe Ghost of Sulphur MountainTrue Till DeathA Cowboy's ProposalFinding the "Last Chance" MineWidowers ThreeMaking GoodGhosts at Circle X CampTwo LovesA Woman's WayThe Cowboy KidThe Man InsideA String of Beads1912–1913
The following are the films made between July 1912 and May 1913 on Méliès's Pacific travels.The Misfortunes of Mr. and Mrs. Mott on Their Trip to TahitiA Tale of Old TahitiUnmasked by a KanakaA Ballad of the South SeasThe Upa Upa DanceThe River WanganuiA Tahitian Fish Drive Hinemoa How Chief Te Ponga Won His BrideLoved by a Maori Chieftess Cast Amid Boomerang ThrowersThe Golden GullyThe Black TrackersThe Foster BrothersGold and the Gilded WayThe Stolen ClaimThe Lure of the Sacred PearlIt Happened in JavaJavanese DancersSnapshots of JavaViews of SamarangNative Industries of JavaThe Robber of AngkorA Cambodian IdyllLost in CambodiaThe Poisoned DartsHis Chinese FriendA Chinese FuneralThe Yellow SlaveThe Rice Industry in JapanTemples of JapanA Japanese WeddingJapanese Judo Commonly Known as Jiu Jitsu''

See also
:Category:Films directed by Gaston Méliès 
:Category:Films produced by Gaston Méliès

References

External links

Cinema pioneers
1845 births
1915 deaths
French film directors
American film directors
19th-century French businesspeople
French cinema pioneers
20th-century French businesspeople
Deaths from food poisoning 
Accidental deaths in France
French expatriates in the United States
Articles containing video clips